Monterey Peninsula Unified School District is a public school district based in Monterey County, California, United States.

The district serves the cities of Del Rey Oaks, Marina, Monterey, Sand City, Seaside and a portion of unincorporated Del Monte Forest.

Schools

Elementary
Crumpton Elementary School
Del Rey Woods Elementary School
Marina Vista Elementary School
Dr. Martin Luther King School of the Arts
Marshall Elementary School
Olson Elementary School
Ord Terrace Elementary School

Middle
Los Arboles Middle School
Seaside Middle School
Walter Colton Middle School

High
Central Coast High School
Marina High School
Monterey High School
Seaside High School

K-8
Dual Language Academy of the Monterey Peninsula
La Mesa School
Monte Vista School

References

External links
 

School districts in Monterey County, California